The Short Stories of F. Scott Fitzgerald is a compilation of 43 short stories by F. Scott Fitzgerald. It was edited by Matthew J. Bruccoli and published by Charles Scribner's Sons in 1989. It begins with a foreword by Charles Scribner II and a preface written by Bruccoli, after which the stories follow in chronological order of publication.

List of stories included
Head and Shoulders (Feb. 1920)
Bernice Bobs Her Hair (May 1920)
The Ice Palace (May 1920)
The Offshore Pirate (May 1920)
May Day (July 1920)
The Jelly-Bean (Oct. 1920)
The Curious Case of Benjamin Button (May 1922)
The Diamond as Big as the Ritz (June 1922)
Winter Dreams (Dec. 1922)
Dice, Brassknuckles, & Guitar (May 1923)
Gretchen's Forty Winks (March 1924)
Absolution (June 1924)
Rags Martin-Jones and the Pr-nce of W-les (July 1924)
The Sensible Thing (July 1924)
Love in the Night (Mar. 1925)
The Rich Boy (Feb 1926)
Jacob's Ladder (Aug. 1927)
A Short Trip Home (Dec. 1927)
The Bowl (Jan. 1928)
The Captured Shadow (Dec 1928)
Basil and Cleopatra (Apr. 1929)
The Last of the Belles (Mar. 1929)
Majesty (July 1929)
At Your Age (Aug. 1929)
The Swimmers (Oct. 1929)
Two Wrongs (Jan. 1930)
First Blood (Apr. 1930)
Emotional Bankruptcy (Aug. 1931)
The Bridal Party (Aug. 1930)
One Trip Abroad (Oct. 1930)
The Hotel Child (Jan. 1931)
Babylon Revisited (Feb. 1931)
A New Leaf (short story) (July 1931)
A Freeze-Out (Dec. 1931)
Six of One- (Feb. 1932)
What a Handsome Pair! (Aug. 1932)
Crazy Sunday (Oct. 1932)
More Than Just a House (June 1933)
Afternoon of an Author (Aug. 1936)
Offside Play aka Athletic Interval (1937; unpublished)
Financing Finnegan (Jan. 1938)
The Lost Decade (Dec. 1939)
"Boil Some Water- Lots of It" (March 1940)
Last Kiss (Apr. 1949)
Dearly Beloved (1969)

Additional short stories include
Gods of Darkness

References

1989 short story collections
Short story collections by F. Scott Fitzgerald